Collected Works is the first box set released by Simon & Garfunkel in 1981. It contains all five of their Studio albums: Wednesday Morning, 3 A.M., Sounds of Silence, Parsley, Sage, Rosemary and Thyme, Bookends, and Bridge over Troubled Water. Originally released in 1981 as a 5-LP box set, it was reissued as a 3-CD set in 1990.

The collection was succeeded in 2001 by The Columbia Studio Recordings (1964–1970), which includes several bonus tracks in addition to the original album contents.

Track listing (CD edition)

Disc one

Wednesday Morning, 3 A.M.
1. "You Can Tell the World" – 2:45
2. "Last Night I Had the Strangest Dream" – 2:12
3. "Bleecker Street" – 2:45
4. "Sparrow" – 2:49
5. "Benedictus" – 2:41
6. "The Sound of Silence" (Original acoustic version) – 3:07
7. "He Was My Brother" – 2:50
8. "Peggy-O" – 2:24
9. "Go Tell It on the Mountain" – 2:06
10. "The Sun Is Burning" – 2:49
11. "The Times They Are a-Changin'" – 2:54
12. "Wednesday Morning, 3 A.M." – 2:17

Sounds of Silence
13. "The Sound of Silence" (Electric instrument overdubs on the original acoustic version) – 3:08
14. "Leaves That Are Green" – 2:23
15. "Blessed" – 3:16
16. "Kathy's Song" – 3:21
17. "Somewhere They Can't Find Me" – 2:37
18. "Anji" – 2:17
19. "Richard Cory" – 2:57
20. "A Most Peculiar Man" – 2:33
21. "April Come She Will" – 1:51
22. "We've Got a Groovy Thing Goin'" – 1:59
23. "I Am a Rock" – 2:49

Disc two

Parsley, Sage, Rosemary and Thyme
1. "Scarborough Fair/Canticle" – 3:11
2. "Patterns" – 2:44
3. "Cloudy" – 2:14
4. "Homeward Bound" – 2:30
5. "The Big Bright Green Pleasure Machine" – 2:45
6. "The 59th Street Bridge Song (Feelin' Groovy)" – 1:40
7. "The Dangling Conversation" – 2:39
8. "Flowers Never Bend with the Rainfall" – 2:12
9. "A Simple Desultory Philippic (Or How I Was Robert McNamara'd Into Submission)" – 2:11
10. "For Emily, Whenever I May Find Her" – 2:04
11. "A Poem on the Underground Wall" – 1:55
12. "7 O'Clock News/Silent Night" – 1:58

Bookends
13. "Bookends Theme" – 0:32
14. "Save the Life of My Child" – 2:49
15. "America" – 3:41
16. "Overs" – 2:11
17. "Voices of Old People" – 2:06
18. "Old Friends" - 2:35
19. "Bookends Theme" (Reprise) – 1:22
20. "Fakin' It" – 3:17
21. "Punky's Dilemma" – 2:14
22. "Mrs. Robinson" – 4:04
23. "A Hazy Shade of Winter" – 2:17
24. "At the Zoo" – 2:22

Disc three

Bridge over Troubled Water
1. "Bridge over Troubled Water" – 4:54
2. "El Condor Pasa (If I Could)" – 3:05
3. "Cecilia" – 2:54
4. "Keep the Customer Satisfied" – 2:33
5. "So Long, Frank Lloyd Wright" – 3:47
6. "The Boxer" – 5:09
7. "Baby Driver" – 3:14
8. "The Only Living Boy in New York" – 3:59
9. "Why Don't You Write Me" – 2:45
10. "Bye Bye Love" – 2:55
11. "Song for the Asking" – 1:49

Simon & Garfunkel compilation albums
1981 compilation albums
Albums produced by Art Garfunkel
Albums produced by Roy Halee
Albums produced by Bob Johnston
Albums produced by Tom Wilson (record producer)